Miloševac may refer to:

 Miloševac (Šabac), a village in Serbia
 Miloševac (Velika Plana), a village in Serbia
 Miloševac (Modriča), a village in Bosnia and Herzegovina